Tehama is a genus of moths of the family Crambidae. It contains only one species, Tehama bonifatella, the western lawn moth, which is found in Greenland and North America, where it has been recorded from Alberta, British Columbia, California, Colorado, Labrador, Manitoba, Nevada, Quebec and Washington. The habitat consists of grasslands.

The wingspan is 21–23 mm. The forewings are yellow fuscous with dark brown areas and a terminal line consisting of a row of dark brown dots. The hindwings are smoky brown. Adults are on wing from May to June.

The larvae feed on various grasses and Trifolium repens.

References

Natural History Museum Lepidoptera genus database

Crambini
Moths of North America
Taxa named by George Duryea Hulst